Bullock-Dew House is a historic home located near Sims, Wilson County, North Carolina.  It was built about 1902, and is a two-story, five bay, asymmetrical, Greek Revival style frame farmhouse.  It has multiple cross gables and ornate and extensive porches. It features stained glass and turned and sawnwork ornament.

It was listed on the National Register of Historic Places in 1986.

References

Houses on the National Register of Historic Places in North Carolina
Queen Anne architecture in North Carolina
Houses completed in 1902
Houses in Wilson County, North Carolina
National Register of Historic Places in Wilson County, North Carolina